John Dickson (born 1967) is an Australian author, clergyman and historian of the ancient world, largely focusing on early Christianity and Judaism. He currently teaches at the graduate school of Wheaton College (Illinois).

Early life 
Dickson was educated at Mosman High School, Sydney and grew up in what he describes as "a typical Aussie home". His family were not 'religious' and rarely discussed spiritual matters. Dickson recalls that he had "never been inside a church before he was sixteen".

On 12 October 1976, Dickson's father died in the Indian Airlines Flight 171 disaster at Bombay Airport. Though only nine, the event raised philosophical questions, asking his mother, “Why did God let Dad's plane crash?” In high school, Dickson was "low performer". He attended Christian Scripture Class (SRE) in the pursuit of a "pleasant way to pass half an hour" and to "ask questions to make the volunteers look stupid". By 15, he had become intrigued by the Christian faith, particularly through a teacher who "presented Jesus in an articulate, funny and intelligent way". He became strongly interested in historical accounts of Jesus Christ, becoming, a “fan of Jesus, and then at 16 a follower of Jesus.".

Dickson was the lead singer of the Christian rock band "In The Silence" through the late 1980s and early 90s and would play up to six shows a week. The band's objective was to "play in pubs and clubs and talk about our faith between songs". Although their lengthy song introductions were not always well received, people would "generally just put up with their Christian spiels".

Education
Dickson has an Honours degree in Theology and a PhD in Ancient History, and was made an Honorary Fellow of the Department of Ancient History at Macquarie University. He also teaches a course on the Historical Jesus for the Department of Jewish Studies at the University of Sydney, is a visiting academic of the Faculty of Classics, University of Oxford, and in 2019 was appointed as the Distinguished Fellow and Senior Lecturer in Public Christianity at Ridley College in Melbourne.

Career
On concluding his years of touring and performance, Dickson's work has been marked by pastoral ministry, media engagement and writing.

Dickson was ordained into the Anglican Church of Australia, going on to serve in several Sydney churches. He served as the senior minister of St Andrew's Anglican Church, Roseville, from 2009 to 2019.

As his pastoral ministry began, Dickson began writing books. Short, evangelistic works at first, such as A Sneaking Suspicion (1995) and the award-winning Simply Christianity: Beyond Religion. Two of his books – The Christ Files and Life of Jesus – became nationally broadcast documentaries. Dickson's output, described as "prolific", has occasionally been surrounded by controversy, both inside and outside the church.

In 2012, Dickson wrote Hearing Her Voice: A Case for Women Giving Sermons. In it, he argued that 1 Timothy 2:12 ("I do not permit a woman to teach or to have authority over a man") does not mean that women cannot give sermons today, since the "teaching" referred to meant "preserving and laying down the traditions handed on by the apostles", and that does not happen in most sermons today. Matthias Media published a volume of essays in response to Dickson's book: Women, Sermons and the Bible: Essays interacting with John Dickson's Hearing Her Voice.

On 6 May 2015, Dickson's book A Sneaking Suspicion (1995) was banned from state schools by the New South Wales Department of Education and Communities on the basis of a "potential risk to students in the delivery of this material, if not taught sensitively and in an age appropriate manner." The ban was lifted 18 May 2015.

Dickson frequently produces opinion pieces, such as for Australia's ABC. In one column he offered to eat a page out of his Bible “if someone could find a full Professor of Ancient History, Classics or New Testament in any real university in the world who argues that Jesus never lived." As of 2021 he claims his personal copy of the scriptures remains safe.

In 2018, Dickson announced that he was stepping down from church ministry to concentrate on public engagement. In 2007, Dickson became founding director of the Centre for Public Christianity and was there until 2019. In September 2019, he created "Undeceptions", a media and podcast platform. It was the leading religious podcast in Australia, UK and Ireland by 2020. In 2022, Undeceptions became a podcast network with existing podcast With All Due Respect (hosted by Michael Jensen and Megan Powell du Toit) joining, and new podcast Small Wonders (hosted by Laurel Moffatt) starting.

Dickson has been a fellow of Macquarie's Department of Ancient History (2004–17), visiting academic of the Faculty of Classics, University of Oxford in the UK (2017–2020) and is distinguished fellow and senior lecturer in Public Christianity at Ridley College (Melbourne), which was announced in March 2019. Wheaton College in Illinois appointed Dickson as its first Jean Kvamme Distinguished Professor of Biblical Evangelism and Distinguished Scholar in Public Christianity in 2022.

Books
The Best Kept Secret of Christian Mission: Promoting the Gospel with More Than Our Lips (Zondervan)
Promoting the Gospel: the Whole of Life for the Cause of Christ (Aquila)
If I Were God, I'd End All the Pain (Matthias Media, 2001)
If I Were God, I'd Make Myself Clearer (Matthias Media)
Simply Christianity: A Modern Guide to the Ancient Faith (Matthias Media) Australian Christian Book of the Year, 2000
A Spectator's Guide to World Religions: An Introduction to the Big Five (Blue Bottle Books) Australian Christian Book of the Year, 2005
The Christ Files: How Historians Know What They Know about Jesus (2006, Blue Bottle Books)
James: the Wisdom of the Brother of Jesus (Aquila, 2006)
Vital Signs: the Wisdom of James for a Life of Faith (Aquila), with Simon Smart
666 and All That: The Truth About the Future (Aquila), with Greg Clarke
Jesus: A Short Life (Lion, 2008)
A Spectator's Guide to Jesus: An Introduction to the Man from Nazareth (2008, Blue Bottle Books)
Mission-Commitment in Ancient Judaism and in the Pauline Communities (Paul Mohr Verlag)
Life of Jesus: Who He Is and Why He Matters (Zondervan, 2010)
Hearing Her Voice: A Case for Woman Giving Sermons (Zondervan, 2014)
A Doubter's Guide to the Bible: Inside History's bestseller for believers and skeptics (Zondervan, 2015)
A Doubter's Guide to the Ten Commandments: How, for better or worse, our ideas about the good life come from Moses and Jesus (Zondervan, 2016)
Humilitas: A Lost Key to Life, Love, and Leadership (Zondervan, 2018)
A Doubter's Guide to Jesus: An introduction to the man from Nazareth for believers and sceptics (Zondervan, 2018)
Is Jesus History? (Good Book Company, 2019)

Young readers
A Hell of a Life: From Manger to Megastar (Matthias Media)
Hanging in There (Matthias Media)
A Sneaking Suspicion (Matthias Media)

References

External links

Centre for Public Christianity
 Undeceptions
Review of Mission-Commitment... from the Journal for the Study of the New Testament

20th-century Australian male writers
20th-century Australian writers
21st-century Australian male writers
21st-century Australian writers
Australian Anglican priests
Australian Christian theologians
Australian historians
Australian musicians
Christian writers
Critics of the Christ myth theory
Living people
Macquarie University alumni
Moore Theological College alumni
1967 births